3430 Bradfield is a stony Agnia asteroid from the central regions of the asteroid belt, approximately  in diameter. It was discovered on 9 October 1980, by American astronomer Carolyn Shoemaker at the Palomar Observatory in California. The Sq-type asteroid was named after comet hunter William A. Bradfield.

Orbit and classification 

When applying the hierarchical clustering method to its proper orbital elements according to Nesvorný, Bradfield is a member of the Agnia family, a very large family of stony asteroids with more than 2000 known members. They most likely formed from the breakup of a basalt object, which in turn was spawned from a larger parent body that underwent igneous differentiation. The family's parent body and namesake is the asteroid 847 Agnia. In the 1995-HCM analysis by Zappalà, however, it is a member of the Liberatrix family (also described as Nemesis family by Nesvorný).

It orbits the Sun in the central main-belt at a distance of 2.5–3.0 AU once every 4 years and 7 months (1,674 days; semi-major axis of 2.76 AU). Its orbit has an eccentricity of 0.10 and an inclination of 4° with respect to the ecliptic.

Naming 

This minor planet was named after New Zealand-born Australian amateur astronomer and rocket engineer William A. Bradfield (1927–2014). A discoverer of several comets himself, he significantly increased the rate of discovery of bright comets from the southern hemisphere during the 1970s and 1980s. The official naming citation was published by the Minor Planet Center on 14 April 1987.

Physical characteristics 

In the SMASS classification, Bradfield is an Sq-subtype, that transitions between the common, stony S-type and Q-type asteroids.

Diameter and albedo 

According to the survey carried out by the NEOWISE mission of NASA's Wide-field Infrared Survey Explorer, Bradfield measures 8.492 kilometers in diameter and its surface has an albedo of 0.269.

Rotation period 

As of 2018, no rotational lightcurve of Bradfield has been obtained from photometric observations. The body's rotation period, pole and shape remain unknown.

References

External links 
 Lightcurve Database Query (LCDB), at www.minorplanet.info
 Dictionary of Minor Planet Names, Google books
 Asteroids and comets rotation curves, CdR – Geneva Observatory, Raoul Behrend
 Discovery Circumstances: Numbered Minor Planets (1)-(5000) – Minor Planet Center
 
 

003430
Discoveries by Carolyn S. Shoemaker
Named minor planets
003430
19801009